STRI, formerly the Sports Turf Research Institute, is a consultancy for the development of sports surfaces, based in St Ives, Bingley, West Yorkshire, England, providing advice on the research, design, construction and management of both natural and artificial sports fields of play around the world.

History

STRI was established in the UK in 1929 in response to The Royal and Ancient Golf Club of St Andrews wanting improved greens. Originally, the new outfit rented rooms in St Ives mansion, before moving out into new buildings on the same estate. The institute now operates globally out of three research and design hubs in United Kingdom, Qatar and the Redlands Research Station in Queensland, Australia, servicing over 2,000 clients annually. STRI clients include sports venues, international tournaments, sports governing bodies, sports club owners and facilities managers, local authorities and schools. They provide advice and consultancy to the All England Club for each years Wimbledon championships, and have historically been advisors to the FIFA football World Cup.

In June 1961, Prince Philip became the patron of the institute.

STRI capabilities include R&D, design, consultancy and sustainability disciplines. The headquarters of the STRI is in St Ives, near to Bingley in West Yorkshire, where they have  dedicated to turf research. In 2019, a new office was opened in Hong Kong, which is tied into the Chinese governments' drive to build 60,000 sports pitches.

Specialities

Research & Development, Sports Surfaces Design & Construction, Product Testing & Material Analysis, Stadia Pitch Design and Management, Agronomy & Ecology, Sportsturf Consultancy, Planning, Drainage & Irrigation, Aviation, Environment, Green Spaces, Training.

From 2014 through to 2018, the STRI advised the Commonwealth War Graves Commission on turf related matters in the run up to the 100 year commemorations of the First World War. This included over 23,000 locations in 153 countries.

Notable sporting events
Wimbledon (1990–present)
FIFA World Cup, 2010
London Olympics 2012

References

Companies based in the City of Bradford
Grasses
Research institutes in West Yorkshire
1929 establishments in the United Kingdom
Research institutes in the United Kingdom